Gyeomji of Geumgwan Gaya (r. 492–521) was the ninth  ruler of Geumgwan Gaya, a Gaya state of ancient Korea.  He was the son of King Jilji and Queen Bangwon.

Family
Father: King Jilji (질지왕, 銍知王)
Mother: Lady Bangwon (방원부인, 邦媛夫人)
Wife: Lady Suk (숙부인, 淑夫人) – daughter of a gakgan named Chulchung (출충, 出忠).
1st son: King Guhyeong (구형왕, 仇衡王)
2nd son: Gim Talji (김탈지, 金脫知)

See also 
 List of Korean monarchs
 History of Korea
 Gaya confederacy
 Three Kingdoms of Korea

Notes

References 

Gaya rulers
521 deaths
5th-century monarchs in Asia
6th-century monarchs in Asia
5th-century births